The 1951 Latin Cup was the third edition of the annual Latin Cup which was played by clubs of the Southwest European nations of France, Italy, Portugal, and Spain. The tournament was hosted by Italy, and the Italian club AC Milan was the winner of the tournament after defeating Lille OSC by a score of 5–0 in the final match.

Participating teams

Venues 

The host of the tournament was Italy, and all matches were played in one host stadium.

Tournament

Bracket

Semifinals 

Semifinal replay

Third place match

Final

Goalscorers

See also 

 1951 Zentropa Cup, a similar competition

Notes

References

External links 

 Latin Cup (Full Results) from RSSSF

Latin Cup
International association football competitions hosted by Italy
June 1951 sports events in Europe